Nanette ("Nan") Doak-Davis (born March 7, 1962) is a former American long-distance runner who is a United States national champion in the marathon. Doak-Davis attended University of Iowa where she was a six-time All-American in track and field and cross country. She won the 1989 California International Marathon in a time of 2:33:11.

Doak-Davis married Olympian Barry Davis in 1986.

Achievements

References

External links
Profile at www.hawkeyesports.com
Profile at www.runcim.org

1962 births
Living people
American female long-distance runners
Iowa Hawkeyes women's track and field athletes
Iowa Hawkeyes women's cross country runners
20th-century American women